Clash of Arms Games is a wargaming company best known for a high level of graphics quality and moderately to highly complex games, often focusing on the Napoleonic era, but with offerings in most eras of military history. Besides boardgames, such as the La Bataille series, it has published miniature wargaming rulesets, such as Flint & Steel (winner of the Origins Award for Best Historical Miniatures Rules of 1997)
 and The Dawn of the Rising Sun (one of the 2004 Origins Award winners, for Best Historical Miniatures Rules).

The company's latest release is the highly anticipated The Fires of Midway, a fast-paced and exciting game which allows players to recreate all four of the 1942 carrier battles.

Founder of Theatre of the Mind Enterprises, Inc. Ed Wimble, of which Clash of Arms Games is a trademark, was named to the Clausewitz Award Hall of Fame for 2011 (a Charles S. Roberts Awards).

External links

References 

Game manufacturers
Wargame companies